The 1992 Challenge Cup was the 91st staging of rugby league's oldest knockout competition, the Challenge Cup. Known as the ';;Silk Cut Challenge Cup''' for sponsorship reasons, the final was contested by Wigan and Castleford at Wembley. Wigan won the match 28–12.

Preliminary round

First round

Second round

Quarter-finals

Semi finals

Final

References

External links
Challenge Cup official website 
Challenge Cup 1991/92 results at Rugby League Project

Challenge Cup
Challenge Cup